Lesbian, gay, bisexual, and transgender (LGBT) people in Pakistan face social difficulties compared to non-LGBT persons. Even in large cities, gays and lesbians have to be highly discreet about their sexual orientation. Pakistani law prescribes criminal penalties for same-sex sexual acts. The Pakistani Penal Code of 1860, originally developed under the British Raj, criminalises sodomy with possible penalties of prison sentences from two years to a life sentence and fines. Despite its illegality, homosexual acts are only occasionally prosecuted by authorities in Pakistan. Other morality and public order provisions in the Penal Code are however used to target LGBT Pakistanis.

Discrimination and disapproval of the LGBT community and the associated social stigma, which can lead to harassment and violence, make it difficult for LGBT people to have steady relationships. Nevertheless, the LGBT community is still able to socialise, organise, date, and even—in rare cases—live together as couples, if done mostly in secret.

Sexual encounters between same-sex partners are more accessible in Lahore, in particular for gay and bisexual men. As a result of globalisation, increasing liberalisation trends and advancing social tolerance, private gay parties in Lahore have been increasing for a number of years. In addition, there is a growing number of individuals—generally from more affluent and educated families—who are coming out to their friends and introducing them to their same-sex partner.

In 2018, the Parliament passed the Transgender Persons (Protection of Rights) Act which established broad protections for transgender people. Earlier, in a historic 2009 ruling, the Supreme Court of Pakistan ruled in favour of civil rights for transgender citizens, and further court rulings upheld and increased these rights. Pakistan does not have civil rights laws to prohibit discrimination or harassment on the basis of sexual orientation. Neither same-sex marriages nor civil unions are permitted under current law and are scarcely ever brought up in the political discourse.

Legality of same-sex sexual activity 

Pakistani law is a mixture of both British law and Islamic law. The section of the Penal Code criminalising consensual same-sex relations was inherited from the colonial rule of the British Raj; it was enacted on 6 October 1860 and went into force on 1 January 1862. Written by Lord Macaulay, the then-named Indian Penal Code 1860, made male same-sex sexual acts illegal under the British law of "Unnatural Offences". After Pakistan gained independence in 1947, the Parliament retained the Penal Code, merely changing the title to Pakistan Penal Code (Act XLV of 1860). Within the Penal Code, Article 377 ("Unnatural Offences") states: "Whoever voluntarily has carnal intercourse against the order of nature with any man, woman or animal, shall be punished with imprisonment ... for a term which shall not be less than two years nor more than ten years, and shall also be liable to fine".

As part of the Islamisation of Pakistan, the Hudood Ordinances were enacted in 1979, stipulating severe punishments for adultery, fornication, consuming alcohol and sodomy. The amendments included corporal and capital punishments, such as whipping of up to 100 lashes and death by stoning if married (for adultery).  According to the United States State Department's 2021 Country reports on human rights practices: Pakistan,  the Hudood Ordinances have not been enforced "since the 1985 lifting of martial law", and there are no known cases of it being applied to same-sex sexual conduct. No known executions for homosexual activity have occurred.

Pakistan Penal Code of 1860 
Relevant sections of the penal code are as follows:
 Article 141 – An assembly of five or more persons is designated an "unlawful assembly" if the common object of the persons composing that assembly is... to commit any mischief or criminal trespass, or other offence.
 Article 153 – Whoever by words, either spoken or written, or by signs, or by visible representations, or otherwise, induce or attempts to induce any student, or any class of students, or any institution interested in or connected with students, to take part in any political activity which disturbs or undermines, or is likely disturb or undermine, the public order shall be punished with imprisonment which may extend to two years or – with fine or with both.
 Article 268 – A person is guilty of a public nuisance who does any act or is guilty of an illegal omission which causes any common injury, danger or annoyance to the public or to the people in general who dwell or occupy property in the vicinity, or which must necessarily cause injury, obstruction, danger or annoyance to persons who may have occasion to use any public right.
 Article 269 – Whoever unlawfully or negligently does any act which is, and which he knows or has reason to believe to be, likely to spread the infection of any disease dangerous to life, shall be punished with imprisonment of either description for a term which may extend to six months, or with fine, or with both.
 Article 270 – Whoever malignantly does any act which is, and which he knows or has reason to believe to be, likely to spread the infection of any disease dangerous to life, shall be punished with imprisonment of either description for a term which may extend to two years, or with fine, or with both.
 Article 290 – Whoever commits a public nuisance in any case not otherwise punishable by this Code, shall be punished with fine which may extend to six hundred rupees.
 Article 292 – Prohibits the sale, distribution, exhibition, ownership or importation of any, "obscene" books, pamphlets, or other literature or images.
 Article 294 – Prohibits any "obscene" public acts, songs, music or poems.
 Article 371A – Whoever sells, lets to hire, or otherwise disposes of any person with intent that such a person shall at any time be employed or used for the purpose of prostitution or illicit intercourse with any person or for any unlawful and immoral purpose, or knowing it to be likely that such person shall at any time be employed or used for any such purpose, shall be punished with imprisonment which may extend to twenty-five years, and shall also be liable to fine.
 Article 371B – When a female is sold, let for hire, or otherwise disposed of to a prostitute or to any person who keeps or manages a brothel, the person so disposing of such female shall, until the contrary is proved, be presumed to have disposed of her with the intent that she shall be used for the purpose of prostitution. For the purposes of this section and section 371B, "illicit intercourse" means sexual intercourse between persons not united by marriage.
 Article 377 – Whoever voluntarily has carnal intercourse against the order of nature with any man, woman or animal, shall be punished with imprisonment for life, or with imprisonment of either description for a term which shall not be less than two years nor more than ten years, and shall also be liable to fine.  Penetration is sufficient to constitute the carnal intercourse necessary to the offence described in this section.
 Article 496 – Whoever, dishonestly or with a fraudulent intention, goes through the ceremony of being married, knowing that he is not thereby lawfully married, shall be punished with imprisonment of either description for a term which may extend to seven years, and shall be liable to fine.

Constitutional rights 
The Pakistani Constitution does not explicitly make mention of sexual orientation or gender identity. It does contain certain provisions that may impact the constitutional rights of LGBT Pakistani citizens.

 Part II 37. The government pledges to promote Islamic values among its Muslim citizens, to protect marriage and the family and to oppose obscenity.
 Part IX 227. Islam is the official state religion, and all laws, rules, regulations and other such legislation must be compatible with Islam, as defined by a government appointed Islamic council.

Discrimination protections 
No civil rights legislation exists to prohibit public or private sector discrimination on the basis of sexual orientation. However, since 2018, discrimination on the basis of gender identity is prohibited in a wide range of areas, including employment, education, health care, access to goods and services, housing and public office. The International Commission of Jurists summarises the coverage of the act: 

The Green Party of Pakistan has expressed some support for LGBT rights, but most political parties either ignore the issue of LGBT rights or oppose LGBT rights on religious grounds.

Sociologists Stephen O. Murray and Badruddin Khan have written that the penal laws themselves are rarely enforced directly, but are used by the police and other private citizens as a form of blackmail.

In March 2012, at the Human Rights Council, Hina Jilani, who was then also Chair of the Human Rights Commission of Pakistan and former Special Representative of the Secretary-General, said,it was very important to emphasise that a serious obstacle was the persistent denial of protection for people from violence on the basis of sexual orientation and gender identity. That denial and rejection were not prudent for any Government that claimed the commitment to the promotion and protection of human rights. It was not convincing when culture and religion were used as a shield and an excuse for failure to protect. There was no notion of responsibility that allowed duty bearers to selectively hold out on protection.

Gender identity and expression 

In most South Asian nations, there is a concept of third gender where members are referred to by society as neither man nor a woman. Pakistan is no different and has a vibrant culture of hijras. While the term is commonly used in South Asia, it is considered derogatory in Urdu and the term khawaja sara is used instead. They are sometimes referred to as transgender, intersex or eunuchs in English language publications. Like transgender people in many countries, they are sometimes the subjects of ridicule, abuse, and violence. That said, they enjoy a certain level of acceptance due to their position in precolonial society. For example, they are welcome at weddings where they will dance as entertainment for the men, and are also welcome among the women.

Their presence in society is usually tolerated and are considered blessed in the Pakistani culture. Most khawaja saras are deemed to have been direct cultural descendants of the court eunuchs of the Mughal era. Thought to be born with genital dysphoria and afraid that they might curse one their fate, people listen to their needs, give them alms, and invite their presence at various events and functions, e.g., birth of a child, circumcisions, or weddings. This mysteriousness that shrouds their existence was born of the fact that the khawaja sara communities live a very secretive life. In 2004, it was reported that Lahore alone has 10,000 active transvestites.

People have started accepting sex reassignment surgery to change their sex as a norm as compelled by gender dysphoria. There are situations where such cases have come into the limelight. A 2008 ruling at Pakistan's Lahore High Court gave permission to Naureen, 28, to have a sex change operation, although the decision was applicable only towards people suffering from gender dysphoria.

In 2009, the Pakistani Supreme Court ruled in favour of a group of transvestites. The landmark ruling stated that as citizens they were entitled to the equal benefit from the federal and provincial governments' financial support schemes such as the Benazir Income Support Programme (BISP). Pakistan's Chief Justice, Iftikhar Chaudhry, was the architect of major extension of rights to Pakistan's transgender community during his term.

In 2010, the Supreme Court ordered the full recognition of the transgender community, including the provision of free medical and educational facilities, microcredit schemes and job quotas for transgender people in every government department. They did not order protections for transgender people against discrimination in public services or housing.

In 2017, the Lahore High Court ordered the Government to include transgender people in the national census.

In February 2018, a Senate committee determined that transgender people could inherit property without being required to have their gender decided by a medical board.

In May 2019, Shireen Mazari, the Federal Minister for Human Rights, appointed Ayesha Moghul, a transgender woman to her department for the first time.

Transgender Person (Protection of Rights) Act 2018 
Under the Transgender Person (Protection of Rights) Act 2018, Pakistanis may choose to self-identify as male, female, both or neither. They may express their gender according to their own preferences, and they may have their gender identity of choice reflected on their documents, "including National Identification Cards, passports, driver's licenses and education certificates." The act ensures transgender people's "fundamental rights to inheritance, education, employment, vote, hold public office, health, assembly, and access to public spaces and property. It confirms that they enjoy all the rights that the nation’s constitution grants to its citizens."

The act defines "transgender person" as someone with a "mixture of male and female genital features or congenital ambiguities", or, a male who "undergoes genital excision or castration", or, more broadly, "any person whose gender identity and/or gender expression differs from the social norms and cultural expectations based on the sex they were assigned at the time of their birth," which allows people to self-identify as such. They are guaranteed the right to inherit assets and to run for public office. The law has been widely hailed by Pakistani transgender activists as progressive in its language and scope. Mehlab Jameel, an activist and researcher who worked with the Parliamentarians to draft the law, said that "This kind of development is not only unprecedented in Pakistani history, but it's one of the most progressive laws in the whole world."

The bill unanimously passed the Pakistani Senate in early March 2018. On 8 May 2018, the National Assembly voted to pass the bill. It was signed into law when acting President Muhammad Sadiq Sanjrani gave his assent on 18 May 2018.

In August 2018, the School Education Department of the  largest province in the country, Punjab, instructed its officials to guarantee equal access to schools to transgender children as per the Transgender Persons (Protection of Rights) Act 2018. The department told its officials to include their gender when they are being admitted to schools and give equal importance to transgender children during enrolment drives. The department instructed its officials that the instructions were binding on government as well as privately owned schools in the province. Punjab became the first province to take practical steps in the implementation of the Act.

Acceptance in media and popular culture

Gay and lesbian 

Media discussions of LGB people in Pakistan include a 2015 documentary How Gay is Pakistan? and a 2016 Vice documentary Blackout: Being LGBT in the Islamic Republic of Pakistan. In 2015, Mawaan Rizwan travelled to Pakistan, his country of birth, to film the documentary How Gay Is Pakistan? which explores the issues faced by other LGBTQ Muslims living under Islamic law that deems homosexuality illegal. The documentary was televised internationally, including on ABC2 in Australia, CBC in Canada and in various markets via Amazon Prime Video.

On 9 June 2016, Vice News released a short documentary in which they showed different members of the LGBT community in Lahore. Young men who are sex workers were shown in the video and they explained the difficulties of being gay in Pakistan. The documentary also focused on some underground organisations that work for basic human rights for the LGBT community. In the film, there is a short clip shown of a young boy getting beaten up and is later sodomised with a tree branch after he was caught in homosexual acts by conservative religious society members. It also displayed how gay and transgender people use social media apps like Tinder to get in contact with other people of the community. However, this documentary, made in collaboration with Google's technology incubator Jigsaw, has been criticised by some for its sensational approach and blatantly showcasing Google's agenda of juxtaposing empowerment through digital technologies such as Tinder and the collective backwardness and oppression as shown through the blurred video of the young boy being beaten.

Transgender 

In 2005, Ali Saleem, 28, the son of an army colonel, appeared on Geo TV's Hum Sub Umeed Se Hain as cross-dressed Benazir Bhutto. So loved were his performances that he has taken to act to extremes on-air and presents his own talk show where he appears as a dragged-up character named Begum Nawazish Ali. Begum would almost always interview influential politicians, e.g. Naimatullah Khan who was a member of Jamaat-e-Islami Pakistan and former Mayor of Karachi.
His character self is often compared to Dame Edna Everage.

To raise awareness of LGBT issues, author Eiynah published a children's book called My Chacha is Gay. Toronto LGBT bookstores have added the book to their shelves in recent years. The topic of LGBT issues remains taboo in Pakistan to discuss, despite curiosity. Relative to its total Google searches, for the year ending 15 June 2013, Pakistan was the world leader for searches of the term "shemale sex", second in the world for searches of "man fucking man", and third in the world for searches of "gay sex pics".

In June 2016, a small clerical body in Lahore known as Tanzeem Ittehad-i-Ummat declared transgender marriages legal under Islamic law.

In November 2016, Kami Sid, a transgender activist, did a photoshoot with photographer Haseeb M. Siddiqui, stylist Waqar J. Khan and makeup artist Nighat Misbah, as a form of protest against the atrocities committed against transgender people in Pakistan. One such atrocity was the death of transgender woman, Alisha. The woman died while staff mocked and belittled the patient and her friends; treatment was significantly delayed while staff decided whether her care should occur in a male ward or female ward.

While Pakistan has addressed a "third" gender when identifying transgender people, Sid believes more can be done. Sid is quoted as saying "We have to understand that by just mentioning the third gender identity on your CNIC, the state has not done enough. It is not enough that the government has fixed a two percent job quota either. No! It’s a protracted fight that we have to continue to get equal opportunities".

Prior to the photoshoot, Sid had already been a part of two documentaries How Gay is Pakistan? and Chuppan Chuppai to shed light on what it means to be transgender in Pakistan. In January 2017, Sid discussed a new movie she was starring in, Rani, in which she played a transgender woman who finds an abandoned baby and raises it as her own. Hina Pathani, another prominent transgender activist, starred alongside Kami Sid in Rani. The movie was directed by Hammad Rizvi, and produced by GrayScale. Sid was hopeful that it would have a positive impact on Pakistan's societal view of transgender people, much like the photoshoot. Sid was helpful in the development of the show by providing advice on the preconceived notions of transgender people in the TV show Khuda Mera Bhi Hai. Asma Nabeel, the writer of the show, consulted Sid for guidance on transgender questions.

Kami Sid was also accused of rape and sexual assault after which Aurat March organisers removed her from serving as a part of their organising team in 2018. Though Sid rejects the allegations, Aurat March organisers issued a statement that she intimidated them. Kami Sid's participation in the PR campaign Change The Clap has also been critiqued for appeasing neoliberal forces and ignoring local practices of the Khawaja Sira community.

In March 2017, a well-known music band featured a transgender model Rimal Ali in their music video. Rimal Ali has performed as an actress and model in many music videos to further her career.

In March 2017, Mani AQ became the first transgender man in Pakistan's history to officially register himself as male. Mani is a well known human rights activist and also one of the task force team members who were closely involved during the Transgender Act 2018 and now involved in the Provincial bill for Transgender Person Protection of Rights. He is actively working on the implementation of the Act, inclusion of transgender men in policies, and for visibility of transgender men in Pakistan.

In 2018, Nisha Rao attained her law degree from Karachi's Sindh Muslim Law College and became Pakistan's first transgender lawyer.

Before this, no term or translation existed to cover the whole transgender spectrum in Urdu. The new term encompasses transgender women (MTF), transgender men (FTM), non-binary people, and other gender expressions.

In 2020, a transgender woman named Gul Panra was shot dead in the Pakistani city of Peshawar. This is the latest case of attacked on the LGBT community in the county. Along with her, a friend of Gul's were also injured, but escaped death. Since 2015, it is reported that 68 transgender people were murdered in Pakistan. However, a total of 479 transgender people were attacked since 2018 in the Pakistani province of Khyber-Pakhtunkhwa alone. But, these figures may not  include the actual figure, as recording of anti-trans violence is poor.

Living conditions 
Several incidents of pederasty by clerics towards young boys at religious schools (madrasahs) have been reported. It is difficult for the victims to get justice in these situations because the public does not want to believe that a cleric could engage in pederasty and the victims, young boys who are forced to be the receptive partner in anal intercourse, are often perceived as being gay and are thus subjected to social hostility and even legal sanctions.

While the LGBT community is not ready to tackle such abuse and prejudices, a growing number of gay and bisexual men are creating social networks.

Metropolitan areas like Lahore and Karachi have seen many gay men, mostly from the middle and upper classes, enjoying themselves at parties aimed at proclaiming their "gay pride". These usually involve large numbers of men dancing together in huge isolated rooms modelled into a discothèque environment and making out. In 2008, an incident that caught the eyes of passers-by was a group of cross-dressed men dancing to Bollywood tunes on a rooftop on the day of Basant. An anonymous interviewee told the BBC that he cannot remember an occasion in almost 10 years that he has felt threatened with regards to his sexuality in Pakistan.

In 2003, however, three Pakistani men were arrested in the city of Lahore when one of their relatives turned them in for engaging in same-sex sexual acts at a private party. Their punishment was not known.

In 2005, a man named Liaquat Ali, 42, from the Khyber region bordering Afghanistan married fellow tribesman Markeen, 16, with the usual pomp and show associated with tribal weddings. Upon hearing of the man's religious infidelity, a tribal council told the pair to leave the area or face death.

Where men are now opening up to sexuality, lesbianism has lesser exposure in the country and publicised events of women indulging in same-sex relationships are rare. One such court case, decided in 2008, displayed the same disapproving attitude towards a lesbian relationship as it would have towards two men involved.

In 2016, a 23-year-old activist named Alisha was shot seven times and was taken to Lady Reading Hospital in Peshawar, where she was left to bleed to death as the staff argued over whether they should take Alisha to the men's ward or women's ward. Alisha's friends reported that the men discrimined against and taunted them, asked if Alisha's blood was "HIV-positive" and asked for her friend's phone number to invite her to a dance party. Alisha was an avid activist for the transgender community and worked hard all her life to make a living. Alisha's friend Farzana said that transgender people are easily targeted as they are weak and have no social status. Even though the Government has passed laws in favour of transgender people, the locals tend to not accept them and deny them basic education and healthcare. The morning after Alisha's death, an activist group called Trans Action posted a status on Facebook directed to the local authorities saying, "Kill all of us."

In November 2017, a transgender woman was gunned down in Peshawar. Initial reports from the police suggest that the perpetrator was closely related to the victim and that it might be an incident of honour killing.

In 2017, in an interview with Manchester Evening News, a 40-year-old woman who used the name Zayna talked about her life as a lesbian Muslim in Pakistan before she moved to the United Kingdom. She talked about how she had to face major beatings and a lot of discrimination. She was told she cannot be a lesbian if she is a Muslim and was told to leave her university and workplace because of her sexuality.

Some transgender women in Pakistan use hormones and silicone to bring focus on their feminine characteristics; however, this is usually done in terrible medical conditions without proper equipment and supervision, as expensive sex change surgeries in Pakistan are not done mostly due to lack of education on the topic and the taboos of society.

Even though the Pakistani government recognises a third gender on ID cards, many people from the transgender community are hesitant to apply for it as they will not be allowed to enter the holy city of Mecca in Saudi Arabia as a transgender person.

Government stance

UNHRC vote 
The Pakistani Government has always shown resistance towards the issue of LGBT rights and never hid its intolerance. A United Nations vote cast on 25 April 2003 on issues of LGBT human rights was derailed at the last minute by an alliance of five disapproving Muslim countries, including Pakistan. The others were Egypt, Libya, Saudi Arabia and Malaysia.

The countries delayed their votes to stall the process and proposed amendments that were meant to kill the measure deliberately, removing all references to discrimination on the basis of sexual orientation, rendering the resolution meaningless. The resolution was tabled by Brazil with support from 19 of the 53 member countries of the UN Human Rights Commission (UNHRC) in Geneva. It called on member states to promote and protect the human rights of all persons, regardless of their sexual orientation.

Politics 
Political parties, interest groups and other political organisations in Pakistan are required to support Islam and public morality.  The small Green Party has expressed some support for LGBT rights, but political groups tend to avoid the issue or express opposition.

Transgender people are treated differently, at least on paper, than gay, lesbian and bisexual people. Pakistani citizens who are transgender or a member of the third gender are a recognised minority group and are thus entitled to certain civil rights.

Media 
Pakistani media strictly censors LGBT related news stories. In late 2013, the Government of Pakistan censored the website Queerpk.com from being viewed.

When a Chinese court accepted to hear a case regarding the issue of same-sex marriage, the news story received substantial international coverage. However, in the Pakistani version of the International New York Times (Express Tribune), the picture accompanying the article was censored and a blank space was left on the front page of the newspaper. Daily Times columnist Farman Nawaz raised several questions about this kind of journalistic approach.

In July 2016, a young Pakistani man named Ihsan wrote an article in the UK-based gay e-zine Gay Star News about his experiences of being gay in Pakistan. He described Pakistani society and laws as hostile towards LGBT people. He wrote, "The status of LGBTI people, socially and legally, is at its worst. LGBTI people face prosecution by the state. And the subject is still taboo – considered too disgusting to talk about." His surname was omitted for his security.

While national media and state have censored queer discourses, transnational documentaries such as How Gay is Pakistan?, Being LGBT in the Islamic Republic of Pakistan, and Transgenders: Pakistan's Open Secret have been critiqued for their neo-colonial, self-othering, disciplinary, and moralistic narratives. Similar documentaries made on other countries such as Uganda and Turkey have been critiqued for their tourist gaze, inadequate research, sweeping statements, and sensational approaches that create binary between sexually empowered Western countries and sexually backward rest of the world.

HIV/AIDS 
One of the issues that has opened up public discussion about LGBT rights has been the effort to combat the spread of HIV/AIDS among men who have sex with other men, but who do not necessarily identify as being gay or bisexual. UNAIDS official reports suggest that they are targeting night truck drivers who are known for having sex with younger men.

The AIDS pandemic first arose in Pakistan in 1987, and government reports estimate (as of 2004) that nearly 3,000 Pakistanis were living with the syndrome, although several critics believe that the Government is underestimating the problem.
It is believed that the number may have risen to somewhere between 70,000 and 80,000 people,
and possibly as high as 210,000 (as in the UNAIDS Pakistan reports).

Today, a small number of organisations exist in Pakistan to promote greater education about HIV/AIDS, including the Association for People Living With AIDS/HIV in Pakistan, which was created in 2006. One of the few public educators is a woman named Shukria Gul, who was infected by her husband. She has been fighting ever since to raise awareness of the virus, and has been highly critical of the Government's efforts.

Ignorance about the virus, and how it is spread, is commonplace; this is particularly true among people performing high-risk behaviour such as prostitutes. Pakistani prostitutes do not have access to condoms or contraception, and there is little effort to provide any sort of public health education for this high-risk group.

Where there was no public call for tolerance or acceptance of LGBT people, the subject of sexual orientation and gender identity are becoming more openly discussed, especially in light of the HIV/AIDS pandemic.

A survey done in 2009 showed that male and transgender sex workers in Pakistan were at high risk of HIV/AIDS mostly as they had sex with IDU clients. Because of lack of knowledge and education on this topic, the health of sex workers is at risk.

US Embassy Islamabad incident 
On 4 July 2011, the US Embassy in Islamabad hosted an LGBT event in support of gay rights in Pakistan. The embassy described the event as its first gay, lesbian, bisexual and transgender pride celebration. Jamaat-e-Islami and other groups of religious conservatives in Pakistan condemned the event and went on a protest. Over 75 people attended, including Pakistani LGBT organisation advocates. Many Pakistanis were greatly offended by this and called this event an act of "social and cultural terrorism against the country". In news speculation, it was also said by religious leaders that homosexuals cannot be "Pakistani" or "Muslim". Dawn wrote that it was seen as the second most dangerous attack from the US to Pakistan after dropping missiles as this issue was so serious. Violence against the LGBT community raised a lot after this controversial incident. The US Deputy Chief of Mission Ambassador Richard Hoagland replied back to the backlash saying that the US will fight for equal rights for everyone regardless of their sexual orientation and that the embassy will support anyone from the LGBT community. However, many LGBT advocates from Pakistan were not in support of everything that had happened and thought that the public eye was not what was needed for the LGBT community.

Public opinion 
Public opinion regarding LGBT politics is complex. In June 2013, the Pew Research Center stated that of 39 countries studied, Pakistan was one of the least accepting of homosexuality with 87% of those surveyed saying "Homosexuality should not be accepted by society".

According to a 2017 poll carried out by ILGA, a plurality of 45% of Pakistanis agreed that gay, lesbian and bisexual people should enjoy the same rights as straight people, while 36% disagreed (with rest being undecided). Additionally, 41% agreed that they should be protected from workplace discrimination. 46% of Pakistanis, however, said that people who are in same-sex relationships should be charged as criminals, while 31% disagreed. As for transgender people, 49% agreed that they should have the same rights, 51% believed they should be protected from employment discrimination and 44% believed they should be allowed to change their legal gender.

According to a World Values Survey from 2017 to 2020, 44% of Pakistanis said that same-sex couples are as good parents as heterosexual couples, while 31% disagreed. In the same survey, 59% of Pakistanis said they would accept a homosexual neighbour, while 41% would not.

Summary table

See also 

 Human rights in Pakistan
 Al-Fatiha Foundation
 LGBT rights in Asia
 LGBT history in Pakistan
 Transgender Persons (Protection of Rights) Act, 2018
 Prostitution in Pakistan
 Death penalty for homosexuality

References

External links 
 

 
Law of Pakistan